Babinkino is a rural locality (a selo) in Dubovskoye Rural Settlement, Yelansky District, Volgograd Oblast, Russia. The population was 214 as of 2010. There are 8 streets.

Geography 
Babinkino is located on Khopyorsko-Buzulukskaya Plain, on the Yelan River, 26 km northwest of Yelan (the district's administrative centre) by road. Toryanoye is the nearest rural locality.

References 

Rural localities in Yelansky District